Lin Jicheng (born 8 April 1957) is a Chinese sports shooter. He competed in the men's 50 metre rifle three positions event at the 1984 Summer Olympics.

References

1957 births
Living people
Chinese male sport shooters
Olympic shooters of China
Shooters at the 1984 Summer Olympics
Place of birth missing (living people)
20th-century Chinese people